Way to Go may refer to:

Music

Albums
 1986 Way to Go, an Australian hit-song compilation album

Songs
 "Way to Go!", a 2005 song by Rogue Traders
 "Way to Go!", a 2009 song by Girls' Generation from Gee
 "Way to Go", a 2017 song by Joyner Lucas featuring Snoh Aalegra from 508-507-2209
 "Way to Go", a 2017 song by Empire of the Sun from Two Vines
 "Way to Go", a 1999 song by Flotsam and Jetsam from Unnatural Selection

Film and television
 Way to Go (TV series), a British television sitcom
 "Way to Go" (CSI), an episode of CSI: Crime Scene Investigation

Other uses
 Way to Go (interactive), a 2015 interactive VR work